Ante Rajković (born 17 August 1952 in Jardol village near Vitez, PR Bosnia and Herzegovina, FPR Yugoslavia) is a Bosnian-Herzegovinian defender who played for SFR Yugoslavia.

International career
He made his debut for Yugoslavia in a June 1977 friendly match away against Brazil and has earned a total of 6 caps, scoring no goals. His final international was a May 1978 friendly against Italy.

References

External links

Profile on Facebook
Profile on Serbian federation site

1952 births
Living people
People from Vitez
Croats of Bosnia and Herzegovina
Association football defenders
Bosnia and Herzegovina footballers
Yugoslav footballers
Yugoslavia international footballers
FK Sarajevo players
Swansea City A.F.C. players
Yugoslav First League players
English Football League players
Yugoslav expatriate footballers
Expatriate footballers in Wales
Yugoslav expatriate sportspeople in Wales